Protogygia polingi is a species of cutworm or dart moth in the family Noctuidae. It was first described by William Barnes and Foster Hendrickson Benjamin in 1922 and it is found in North America.

The MONA or Hodges number for Protogygia polingi is 10896.

References

Further reading

 
 
 

Noctuinae
Articles created by Qbugbot
Moths described in 1922